The Remixes is an album by Elvis Crespo.

Track listing 
 "Suavemente" (Hot Head Mix)
 "Tu Sonrisa" (Eddie 'Love' Arroyo-Remix)
 "Tiemblo" (A.T. Molina Remix)
 "Come Baby Come" (with Gisselle D'Cole)
 "Suavemente" (Cibola Extended)
 "Tu Sonrisa" (Club Off The Wall Mix)
 "Tiemblo" (A Que No Te Atreves-Mix)
 "Come Baby Come" (Club Remix)
 "Suave" (Megamix)

Sales and certifications

References 

Elvis Crespo remix albums
2000 remix albums
Spanish-language remix albums
Sony Discos remix albums